Slippery Bill Mountain is a summit in Flathead County, Montana, in the United States.

Slippery Bill Mountain was named after William H. Morrison, a pioneer trapper.

References

External links
 Biography of William "Slippery Bill" Morrison

Mountains of Flathead County, Montana
Mountains of Montana